Henri Cornet (born Henri Jardry; 4 August 1884 – 18 March 1941) was a French cyclist who won the 1904 Tour de France. He is its youngest winner, just short of his 20th birthday.

Background

Cornet was born in the Pas-de-Calais region of northwest France and was registered at birth under his mother's name. Then he was adopted by his stepfather, who gave him the name Jardry. It's not known why he changed his name from Henri Jardry to Henri Cornet. He was a talented amateur—he won Paris-Honfleur in 1903—but little known beyond northern France and in Belgium when he entered the second Tour de France in 1904. It was his first year as a professional. The organizer, Henri Desgrange, promoted his unknown competitors to readers of L'Auto, the newspaper he edited, by giving them nicknames. He called Cornet Le Rigolo, or "the joker", for his sense of fun. He is described as cheerful, with wide-spaced eyes, a nose described as trumpet-like, and a generous mouth that spread easily into a smile.

Tour de France

The Tour de France had proved a success when the first race was run in 1903 and both the competition between riders and the passion of the fans who supported them rose to sometimes dangerous proportions. Riders took trains and lifts in cars or had themselves towed by drivers; a rider called Pierre Chevalier was repeatedly left exhausted in the darkness of night only to reappear in the race; the 1903 winner, Maurice Garin received food from the race director, Géo Lefèvre when others were denied. Fans beat up riders on the col de la République outside St-Étienne and dispersed only when Garin fired his gun.

Other spectators threw nails on the road on the last day and Cornet rode the last 40 km on flat tires. After many complaints about widespread cheating, the top four finishers were disqualified by the French cycling union.  It declared Cornet the winner although he had taken three hours more than Garin, the winner and receiving an official warning that suggests his own conduct was less than pristine.  Desgrange said he would never run the race again.

After 1904

Henri Cornet never had further success in the Tour, dropping out in 1905 on the fourth day. He won Paris–Roubaix and came second in Bordeaux–Paris in 1906, and came eighth in the 1908 Tour de France, in which he won a one-lap time-trial held at the end of the race in the Parc des Princes. It was a demonstration race and did not count for the overall result of the Tour.

He was a fluid rider talented at repeated short efforts.

Retirement and death

Cornet rode his last Tour de France in 1912, finishing 28th. He had repeated health problems, however, which brought his career to an end. He stopped racing with the start of World War I. He retired to work in the cycle business (négoce cycliste) and died after a hospital operation at 56. A road in Prunay-le-Gillon is named after him.

Career achievements

Major results

1904
1904 Tour de France:
 Winner overall classification
Winner stage 3
1906
Paris–Roubaix

Grand Tour general classification results timeline

References

1884 births
1941 deaths
Cyclists from Hauts-de-France
French male cyclists
Tour de France winners
French Tour de France stage winners
Sportspeople from Pas-de-Calais